Baseball at the 2004 Summer Olympics was held on two separate diamonds within the Helliniko Olympic Complex, from 15 to 25 August. For the second time in Olympic competition, professional baseball players were eligible to participate, though no active players from Major League Baseball were available.

The competition consisted of a preliminary round with each team playing all the other teams once, for a total of seven games. The top four teams at the end of this round advanced to the medals round. The medals round consisted of two semifinal games with the winners advancing to the gold medal game. The losing teams of the semifinals would play in the bronze medal game.

Team squads

Controversy
Despite being the defending gold medalists, the United States did not make it to Athens after losing a qualifying game to Mexico, 1–0. The Americas Tournament, which decided which two teams from North America, South America and the Caribbean went to Athens, was single-elimination, when almost all other baseball tournaments are double-elimination. Canada eventually defeated Mexico to advance to the Olympics. The qualifying rounds were also scheduled in such a way that the United States could not even use minor-leaguers and had to rely on collegians instead. Many American ballplayers made it to Athens anyway, as members of the nascent Greek team, which featured only one player actually born in Greece.

Others took issue with the fact that three of the eight slots in the Olympics (including the hosts) were European, while the Americas and Asia (with much stronger baseball nations) got only two slots apiece. The absence of such teams as the USA, Mexico, the Dominican Republic and South Korea led to much media discussion.

The 2008 tournament changed the qualifying procedure; the United States qualified, as did Cuba and the host country, China.

Bracket

Results

Preliminary round
The top four teams (Japan, Cuba, Canada and Australia) advanced to the semifinals.  To determine the seed ranking of teams tied in the standings, the result of the two teams' game against each other was used.  Japan therefore received first place due to the win over Cuba. In the semi-finals, Japan (#1) played Australia (#4) and Cuba (#2) played Canada (#3).  The higher ranked team in each game was the home team.

August 15

August 16

August 17

August 18

August 20

August 21

August 22

Semifinals

Bronze medal match

Final

Final standing

References

External links
Official result book – Baseball

 
2004 Summer Olympics events
2004
Summer Olympics
2004 Summer Olympics
Men's events at the 2004 Summer Olympics